Agniolamia albovittata is a species of beetle in the family Cerambycidae. It was described by Stephan von Breuning in 1977. It is known from Gabon.

References

Endemic fauna of Gabon
Lamiini
Beetles described in 1977